The 19573 / 19574 Okha–Jaipur Weekly Express is an Express train belonging to Western Railway zone that runs between  and  in India. It is currently being operated with 19573/19574 train numbers on a weekly basis.

Service

19573/Okha–Jaipur Weekly Express has an average speed of 56 km/hr and covers 1,056 km in 18 hrs 50 mins.
19574/Jaipur–Okha Weekly Express has an average speed of 53 km/hr and covers 1,056 km in 20 hrs 05 mins.

Route & Halts 

The important halts of the train are :

Coach composition

The train has standard ICF rakes with max speed of 110 kmph. The train consists of 23 coaches:

 1 AC II Tier
 5 AC III Tier
 10 Sleeper coaches
 1 Pantry Car
 4 General Unreserved
 2 Seating cum Luggage Rake

Schedule

Traction

Both trains are hauled by a Vatva Loco Shed-based WDM-3A or WDM-3D diesel locomotive from Okha to Jaipur and vice versa.

Rake sharing

The train shares its rake with 22969/22970 Okha–Varanasi Superfast Express.

See also 

 Okha railway station
 Jaipur Junction railway station
 Okha–Varanasi Superfast Express

References

External links 

 19573/Okha–Jaipur Weekly Express India Rail Info
 19574/Jaipur–Okha Weekly Express India Rail Info

Rail transport in Gujarat
Rail transport in Rajasthan
Transport in Okha
Transport in Jaipur
Express trains in India
Railway services introduced in 2012